Société Industrielle Pour l’Aéronautique (SIPA) was a French aircraft manufacturer established in 1938 by Georges Volland. From 1938-1940, SIPA principally manufactured parts for other French aircraft companies.
After World War II, it began developing a series of trainers for the French Air Force.

In 1947, SIPA won a competition for a new two-seat touring and trainer aircraft for France's aero clubs and 113 were produced as the SIPA S.90 series. The SIPA S.1000 Coccinelle was built in small numbers in 1956/57. The SIPA S.200 Minijet, first flown in 1952, was the world's first all-metal two-seat light jet. SIPA was taken over by Aérospatiale in 1975.

Aircraft
Boisavia Anjou
SIPA S.70
SIPA S.90
SIPA S.200 Minijet
SIPA S.300
SIPA S.1000 Coccinelle
SIPA Antilope

References

Notes

Bibliography

 
 

Aérospatiale
Defunct aircraft manufacturers of France
Vehicle manufacturing companies established in 1938
1975 disestablishments in France
French companies established in 1938
Vehicle manufacturing companies disestablished in 1975